Maria Markelivna Posobchuk, Ukrainian: Марія Маркелівна Пособчук (20 January 1890 – 27 March 1992) was a Ukrainian weaver and a member of the Union of Artists of the USSR. Her work is considered part of the same canon of Soviet folk art as Maria Prymachenko.

Biography 
Posobchuk was born on 20 January 1890 in the village of Obukhovychi, in the Kyiv oblast, to a peasant family. All three were taught by Posobchuk and inherited her skills.

Admitted as a member of the Union of Artists of the USSR in 1962, Posobchuk was a renowned textile artist. Her works included tablecloths, bedspreads, napkins and towels, all in a style unique to the region she was from. One of the patterns she was praised for her skill in was a chequerboard design. She died on 27 March 1992, aged 102. At the time of her death she was one of the oldest weavers in Ukraine.

Legacy 
Posobchuk's work was folk art perceived as having flourished under Soviet rule. Similar folk artists are Maria Prymachenko, Tatiana Pata and Ivan Honchar. She was remembered as the founder of a familial dynasty of skilled Ukrainian women weavers. She was featured in a film.

In 2020, the 130th anniversary of her birth was celebrated with a series of events in the region.

References 

1890 births
1992 deaths
Ukrainian centenarians
Ukrainian women artists
Folk artists
Textile artists
Weavers
People from Kyiv Oblast